Platerus is a genus of assassin bugs (family Reduviidae), in the subfamily Harpactorinae.

Species
 Platerus bhavanii Livingstone & Ravichandran, 1991
 Platerus pilcheri Distant, 1903
 Platerus tenuicorpis P. Zhao, C.W. Yang & Cai, 2006

References

Reduviidae
Cimicomorpha genera